WCAP was a short-lived radio station located in Washington, D.C. during the mid-1920s. It was initially licensed in mid-1923 to the Chesapeake and Potomac Telephone Company (C&P), and its call letters were chosen to reflect the station owner. C&P was controlled by the American Telephone & Telegraph Company (AT&T), and the station was the second of two, following WEAF (now WFAN) in New York City, that would be established by AT&T. WCAP was high-powered "Class B" station, and it shared time on the 640 AM frequency with WRC (now WTEM), owned by the Radio Corporation of America (RCA).

On May 11, 1926, AT&T announced that a subsidiary, the Broadcasting Company of America (BCA), had been formed to take over its radio broadcasting assets, including WCAP. Two months later AT&T signed an agreement to sell its BCA subsidiary to RCA for $1 million. Because there was no need for RCA to continue operation of two Washington stations, WCAP ceased broadcasting on July 31, 1926, with its hours ceded to WRC.

References

WCAP
CAP (BCA)
Former AT&T subsidiaries
Radio_stations_established_in_1923 
Radio stations disestablished in 1926 
1923 establishments in Washington, D.C. 
1926_disestablishments_in_Washington,_D.C.
CAP (BCA)